The Best of Blondie (released in Germany and the Netherlands as Blondie's Hits) is the first greatest hits album by American rock band Blondie. It was released on October 31, 1981, by Chrysalis Records. The album peaked at number four in the United Kingdom and number 30 in the United States, while becoming the band's only number-one album in Australia.

Background
The album was issued in several versions with different track inclusion and running order which varied slightly between North American and international editions of The Best of Blondie, highlighting the popularity of particular songs in different countries. The US and Canadian editions included "One Way or Another", which was not issued as a single in Europe. The international version of the album included three songs that were not on the North American release: "Denis", "Picture This" and "Union City Blue".

Blondie's producer Mike Chapman remixed three tracks specially for this album. The special mix of "Heart of Glass" is a version that combines elements from the original album version (also the 7″ single mix in the UK) and the instrumental version. The special mix of "In the Flesh" is a Phil Spector-esque mix, with much echo. The special mix of "Sunday Girl" mixes vocals from the previously released French-language version of the song with the original English version. Additionally, "Rapture" appears in an edited version of the 12″ Disco Mix released in the UK and Europe and includes an extra verse that did not appear on the album Autoamerican, on which the song was originally issued.

The album cover was shot in June 1978 by British photographer Martyn Goddard on a rooftop in Midtown Manhattan.

Video version
A video version of the album was released on VHS, featuring the band's music videos. The video was interspersed with footage of a New York City taxi driver who would see Blondie videos being played on television screens throughout the city. During the intro sequence the song "Call Me" is played, making it another music video. "Sunday Girl" (incomplete) is played during the end credits. The Best of Blondie video album was re-released on DVD in 2002 as a part of Greatest Video Hits to coincide with the release of the album Greatest Hits. The songs "Call Me" and "Sunday Girl" were omitted from the track listing, but not from the video itself. In addition to the entirety of The Best of Blondie, this DVD also includes three bonus tracks not on the original release: "The Hardest Part", "Island of Lost Souls", and "Maria".

Track listing
All tracks are produced by Mike Chapman, except "In the Flesh", "(I'm Always Touched by Your) Presence, Dear", "Rip Her to Shreds" and "Denis", produced by Richard Gottehrer, and "Call Me", produced by Giorgio Moroder. All special mixes are produced by Chapman.

US and Canadian version

International version

Video version

Personnel
Credits adapted from the liner notes of the US and Canadian edition of The Best of Blondie.

Blondie
 Clem Burke – drums
 Jimmy Destri – keyboards
 Nigel Harrison – bass
 Debbie Harry – vocals
 Frank Infante – guitar
 Chris Stein – guitar

Technical
 Mike Chapman – production ; special mix production 
 Richard Gottehrer – production 
 Giorgio Moroder – production

Artwork
 Peter Wagg – art direction
 Martyn Goddard – front cover photography
 Brian Cooke – back cover photography

Charts

Weekly charts

Year-end charts

Certifications and sales

References

1981 greatest hits albums
Albums produced by Giorgio Moroder
Albums produced by Mike Chapman
Albums produced by Richard Gottehrer
Blondie (band) compilation albums
Chrysalis Records compilation albums